Saionji (Fujiwara) Neishi / Yasuko (西園寺（藤原）寧子) later Kōgimon'in (広義門院; 1292–1337) was a Japanese Court lady. 

She was Saionji Sanekane's daughter, and the consort of Emperor Go-Fushimi. 

She became the mother of several children with the emperor:
First daughter: Imperial Princess Junshi (珣子内親王)
Third son: Imperial Prince Kazuhito (量仁親王) later Emperor Kōgon
Fifth son: Imperial Prince Kagehito (景仁親王; b. 1315)
Second daughter: Imperial Princess Kenshi / Kaneko (兼子内親王)
Ninth son: Imperial Prince Yutahito (豊仁親王) later Emperor Kōmyō

References

1292 births
1337 deaths
Japanese ladies-in-waiting
14th-century Japanese women